Rock Champions is a compilation album released by the American hard rock band Great White in 2000.

Track listing 
"Call It Rock n' Roll" – 3:58
"Once Bitten, Twice Shy" – 5:23
"Rock Me" – 7:14
"Move It" – 5:37
"Fast Road" – 3:42
"Can't Shake It" – 4:41
"Gonna Getcha" – 4:13
"Money (That's What I Want)" (Barrett Strong cover) – 3:05
"Red House" (Jimi Hendrix cover) – 8:48
"Afterglow (Of Your Love)" (Small Faces cover) – 5:45
"Desert Moon" – 4:34
"House of Broken Love" – 6:00
"Marliese" – 3:45
"Bitches and Other Women (medley): Bitch / It's Only Rock & Roll (But I Like It) / Women" – 4:47

Tracks 13 is listed as "Marliese", but is actually their cover of Led Zeppelin's "Rock 'N Roll" from Recovery: Live!

References 

Great White compilation albums
2001 compilation albums
EMI Records compilation albums